Zanka may refer to:

Places
 Zanka (Tanzanian ward), an administrative ward in Tanzania
 Zánka, a village in Veszprém county, Hungary

People
 Mathias Jørgensen (born 1990), Danish footballer known as Zanka
 Žanka Stokić (1887–1947), Serbian actress

See also